Dotawo was a Christian kingdom in Lower Nubia (Northern Sudan and Southern Egypt) in the Middle Ages. It is attested in Old Nubian documents from the 12th to the 15th centuries. It is one of the last attested Christian states to survive in the region.

Etymology
Two proposals explain the etymology of the name of Dotawo. The first sees the name as an Old Nubian term meaning "Lower Daw" or the region "Below Daw"), pointing to the Old Nubian suffix -tauo ("under") and the toponym "Daw," widely known from Arabic histories of Christian Nubia. The second sees the name as a calque for the old Egyptian term "Upper and Lower Egypt," proposing a combination of the Old Nubian suffixes -do ("upon") and -tauo ("under").

History
Modern understanding of the history of Dotawo has evolved considerably in recent generations. It had been generally held that Dotawo was one of a number of small successor states to emerge during the prolonged collapse of central government in the Christian kingdom of Makuria. A brief mention in the work of the medieval Egyptian history al-Maqrīzī was taken to indicate that prolonged fighting for control over the capital city, Dongola, devastated that city and compelled the Nubian court to move to Daw, which some modern scholars believed to be modern Gebel Adda, in 1364/65. Under the first etymology of the term "Dotawo" discussed above, it might then be the Nubian state as it survived from its new capital at Daw. Even in earlier periods, prior to the collapse of Dongola, Arab writers report that Nubia was structured with thirteen lesser kings under one "Great King," and Dotawo could have been one of these vassal kingdoms.

The large collection of Old Nubian documents found at Qasr Ibrim in the 1960s pose considerable problems for this view. The texts from Qasr Ibrim show the Eparch of Nobatia (northern Nubian) to be subordinate to the King of Dotawo during Makuria's peak in the 12th century. One explanation for this is that Dotawo is simply another name for Makuria. The depiction of multiple Nubian kings conflicts with the description of the region given by Arab traveler Ibn Selim el-Aswani. In no known document are the names of both Dotawo and Makuria present, and at several points the listed names of the king of Dotawo matches those of Makuria. The first generation of scholars to study the Qasr Ibrim finds found too many apparent conflicts between the names of the kings of Makuria and the kings of Dotawo to be satisfied with this explanation. Later study and re-editing of these texts resolved most of these apparent conflicts, and it now seems likely that "Dotawo" is the indigenous name for the central state of Nubia from at least its first attestation in the 1180s to its last attestation in the 1490s; by 2022, this position was accepted as the scholarly consensus. In 2021, it was suggested that the name "Dotawo" appears so late in the history of Christian Nubia because it referred specifically to the unified kingdom of Makuria and Alodia after a personal union between their royal families in the eleventh century.

See also
Joel of Dotawo

References 

Adams, William Y. "The United Kingdom of Makouria and Nobadia: A Medieval Nubian Anomaly." Egypt and Africa: Nubia from Prehistory to Islam. Edited by W.V. Davies. London: British Museum Press, 1991.

Plumley, J. Martin. "New Light on the Kingdom of Dotawo." Études nubiennes: colloque de Chantilly, 2-6 juillet 1975. Cairo, 1978.

Ruffini, Giovanni R. "Newer Light on the Kingdom of Dotawo." Qasr Ibrim, between Egypt and Africa: Studies in Cultural Exchange. Edited by J. van der Vliet and J.L. Hagen. Leuven: Peeters, 2013.

van Gerven Oei, Vincent. A Reference Grammar of Old Nubian. Leuven: Peeters, 2021.

History of Nubia
Kingdom of Makuria
Former monarchies of Africa